Brent Anthony Fedyk (born March 8, 1967) is a Canadian former professional ice hockey right winger. He was drafted in the first round, 8th overall, by the Detroit Red Wings in the 1985 NHL Entry Draft.

Born in Yorkton, Saskatchewan, Fedyk played five seasons of junior hockey in the Western Hockey League. He made his professional debut with the Red Wings' American Hockey League affiliate, the Adirondack Red Wings, in the 1987–88 season.  He also appeared in two NHL games with Detroit that same season.

After splitting three seasons between Detroit and Adirondack, and then spending two seasons in the NHL full-time, Fedyk joined the Philadelphia Flyers for the 1992–93 season. He recorded the first two 20-goal seasons of his career in his first two seasons in Philadelphia as a member of the Crazy Eights line with Eric Lindros and Mark Recchi.

Fedyk split the 1995–96 season between the Flyers and the Dallas Stars, recording his third 20-goal season.  He then was out of the NHL for two seasons, playing in the International Hockey League.  He had one final stint in the NHL during the 1998–99 season, playing with the New York Rangers.

Fedyk appeared in 470 NHL games in his career, scoring 97 goals and adding 112 assists.  He also appeared in 16 Stanley Cup playoff games, scoring three goals and recording two assists.

Career statistics

References

External links
 

1967 births
Living people
Adirondack Red Wings players
Canadian expatriate ice hockey players in Germany
Canadian expatriate ice hockey players in the United States
Canadian ice hockey right wingers
Canadian people of Ukrainian descent
Cincinnati Cyclones (IHL) players
Dallas Stars players
Detroit Red Wings draft picks
Detroit Red Wings players
Detroit Vipers players
Ice hockey people from Saskatchewan
Kalamazoo Wings (1974–2000) players
Kassel Huskies players
National Hockey League first-round draft picks
New York Rangers players
Philadelphia Flyers players
Portland Winterhawks players
Regina Pats players
Seattle Thunderbirds players
Sportspeople from Yorkton